Michael Bendetti (born August 21, 1967, in Long Beach, California) is an American actor and producer best known for playing Officer Anthony "Mac" McCann in the fifth and final season of the Fox television series 21 Jump Street.

Career
Bendetti studied at the Neighborhood Playhouse in New York City.  His first feature film was in the comedy film Screwball Hotel (1988). Also that year, he appeared in the television film Lady Mobster. Bendetti later starred in the horror film Netherworld (1992). He has also appeared on the television series Baywatch, Doogie Howser, M.D., My Two Dads, Red Shoe Diaries, and in the television films The Big One: The Great Los Angeles Earthquake and Amanda and the Alien.

Bendetti's producing credits include the comedy film Between the Sheets (2003).

Filmography

Film

Television

See also

 List of film producers
 List of people from Long Beach, California
 Lists of actors

External links

 Database (undated).  "Michael Bendetti". The New York Times. Retrieved January 22, 2012.

1967 births
20th-century American male actors
21st-century American male actors
American male film actors
American male television actors
Film producers from California
Living people
Male actors from Long Beach, California